Dr. Sunday O. Fadulu is a noted microbiologist and medical researcher most recognized for his work with sickle cell anemia.  He holds a patent for the treatment of the disease which claimed the lives of two of his brothers in Nigeria.  Fadulu enrolled at Oklahoma Baptist University in 1961, with the encouragement of a Southern Baptist missionary he met. Speaking of his father and the death of his brothers, he has stated, "My father was a man who would never fail. He was so strong," Fadulu said in the chapel service. "The night my brother died, he had my brother in his arms, and I saw his face, and it said that he had failed. I remember the discouragement on his face. I said then that I would find a cure and to do that I would have to go to America."  Fadulu's research used an extract of the African "chewing stick," which he discovered, reverses sickling of red blood cells.  The extract also provides protection from the disease. Medication for treating sickle cell anemia has been through the first phases of approval through the Federal Food and Drug Administration.

Education
B.S., Oklahoma Baptist University

M.S., Ph.D., University of Oklahoma

External links
 http://webcache.googleusercontent.com/search?q=cache:Rloolef-dh0J:bio.tsu.edu/Newsletter/BiologyNewsletterJan2009.pdf+sunday+o.+fadulu+patent&cd=7&hl=en&ct=clnk&gl=us
 http://www.okbu.edu/news/2000-02-03/noted-researcher-receives-obu-honorary-doctorate
 http://bio.tsu.edu/faculty/Fadulu.html

References

Oklahoma Baptist University alumni
University of Oklahoma alumni